Preferential block voting, is a majoritarian voting system for electing several representatives from a single multimember constituency. Unlike the single transferable vote (STV), preferential block voting is not a method for obtaining proportional representation, and instead produces similar results to plurality block voting (a type of multiple non-transferable vote, MNTV), of which it can be seen as the instant-runoff version, making it a multiple transferable vote (MTV). Under both systems, a single group of like-minded voters can win every seat, making both forms of block voting non-proportional.

Casting and counting the ballots 
In preferential block voting, a ranked ballot is used, ranking candidates from most to least preferred. Alternate ballot forms may have two groupings of marks, first giving n votes for an n seat election (as in traditional bloc voting), but also allowing the alternate candidates to be ranked in order of preference and used if one or more first choices are eliminated.

Candidates with the smallest tally of first preference votes are eliminated (and their votes transferred as in instant runoff voting) until a candidate has more than half the vote. The count is repeated with the elected candidates removed and all votes returning to full value until the required number of candidates is elected. An example of this method is described in Robert's Rules of Order.

Effects 
With or without a preferential element, block voting systems have a number of features which can make them unrepresentative of the diversity of voters' intentions. Block voting regularly produces complete landslide majorities for the group of candidates with the highest level of support. Under preferential block voting, a slate of clones of the first winning candidate are guaranteed to win every available seat. Although less representative, this does tend to lead to greater agreement among those elected.

Use 
Block voting was used in the Australian Senate from 1901 to 1948; from 1919, this was preferential block voting. More recently, the system has been used to elect local councils in Australia’s Northern Territory. In elections in 2007 and 2009, Hendersonville, North Carolina used a form of preferential block voting. In 2009, Aspen, Colorado also used a form of preferential block voting for a single election before repealing the system. In 2018, the state of Utah passed a state law creating a pilot program for municipalities to use instant runoff voting for single seat contests and preferential block voting for multi seat contests, and in 2019, Payson, Utah and Vineyard, Utah each held preferential block voting contests for three and two city council seats respectively.

Ballots

See also 
 Block approval voting , its approval voting equivalent
 Single transferable vote, its proportional equivalent 
 Multiple non-transferable vote, its plurality equivalents

References 

Non-proportional multi-winner electoral systems
Preferential electoral systems